Henri Bréchu (born 1 December 1947 in Gap, Hautes-Alpes) is a retired French alpine skier. He finished 11th overall in the 1969–70 FIS Alpine Ski World Cup.

External links
 

1947 births
Living people
French male alpine skiers
People from Gap, Hautes-Alpes
Sportspeople from Hautes-Alpes
20th-century French people